Gruppo Italiano were an Italian Italo disco band formed in 1980. They are best known for the song "Tropicana" that ranked sixth on the Italian hit parade in 1983.

History 

Gruppo Italiano was founded in 1980 when Roberto "Bozo" Del Bo and Chicco Santulli, upon returning to Italy from a four months stay in Los Angeles, California, decided to set up a band that would merge sophisticated musical ideas and humour. The group's best-known line-up comprised Patrizia Di Malta, Raffaella Riva, Gigi Folino, Del Bo and Santulli. In 1984 the group entered the main competition at the Sanremo Music Festival with the song "Anni Ruggenti", that peaked at number 12 on hit parade.

Personnel 

Principal members
 Patrizia Di Malta – vocals
 Raffaella Riva – vocals, percussion
 Gigi Folino – bass
 Roberto "Bozo" Del Bo – drums
 Chicco Santulli – guitar

Discography 

 Maccherock (1982)  
 Tapioca manioca (1984)
 Surf in Italy (1985)

Citations

Sources

External links 

 

1980 establishments in Italy
1989 disestablishments in Italy
Italian pop music groups
Italo disco groups
Musical groups established in 1980
Musical groups disestablished in 1989
Musical groups from Milan
Musical quintets